Trinity High School is a private, coeducational, Roman Catholic high school in Whitesville, Kentucky. It is located in the Roman Catholic Diocese of Owensboro and is next door to its sister school, the K-8 St. Mary of the Woods private Roman Catholic elementary school.

Roman Catholic Diocese of Owensboro
Catholic secondary schools in Kentucky
Schools in Daviess County, Kentucky